George Shearing & Barry Tuckwell Play the Music of Cole Porter is a 1986 album of the music of Cole Porter by jazz pianist George Shearing and classical French horn player Barry Tuckwell. The pair play as a duet on four selections, two are performed as a quartet with bass and drums, and the remaining five are accompanied by a small orchestra of string players. All arrangements are by Shearing.

Reception

Scott Yanow reviewed the album for Allmusic and wrote that "In general Tuckwell does not improvise but Shearing's arrangements give a jazz feel to all of the performances and make the music accessible (if not really essential) to both classical and jazz listeners".

Track listing 
 "I Concentrate on You" – 4:58 (orchestra)
 "Everything I Love" – 2:54 (quartet)
 "I've Got You Under My Skin" – 4:43 (duet)
 "Easy to Love" – 2:19 (orchestra)
 "In the Still of the Night" – 2:45 (duet)
 "Every Time We Say Goodbye" – 4:00 (orchestra)
 "But in the Morning, No" – 2:41 (quartet)
 "So in Love" – 5:32 (orchestra)
 "After You" – 4:27 (duet)
 "All Through the Night" – 3:55 (orchestra)
 "Do I Love You?" – 5:16 (duet)

All compositions by Cole Porter

Personnel 
George Shearing – piano, liner notes, arranger
Barry Tuckwell – french horn, liner notes
Guildhall String Ensemble
Harry Lookofsky, Frederick Buldrini, Lewis Eley, Maura Giannini, Carmel Malin, Joseph Malin, Louann Montesi – violin
Seymour Barab, Avron Coleman, Frederick Zlotkin – cello
Mike Renzi – conductor
John Clayton, Don Thompson – double bass
Grady Tate – drums, percussion
Ed Trabanco – engineer
Carl Jefferson – producer

References

1986 albums
Albums produced by Carl Jefferson
Cole Porter tribute albums
Concord Records albums
George Shearing albums
Instrumental duet albums